The Committee of Canadian Architectural Councils (CCAC) is an organization in Canada of representatives from each of the ten provincial associations of architects. The CCAC manages the development of national policies and standards for the admission to the profession of architecture in Canada. The CCAC is administered by the Royal Architectural Institute of Canada (RAIC).

The CCAC established the Intern Architect Program (IAP) to standardize internship in Canada.

See also
Architect

References

External links
RAIC Programs & Services to Members

Professional certification in architecture
Architecture in Canada
Architecture occupations